A Little Too Late and It's a Little Too Late may refer to the following songs:

 "A Little Too Late" (Pat Benatar song), a 1983 single by Pat Benatar
 "It's a Little Too Late" (Tanya Tucker song), a 1993 single by Tanya Tucker
 "It's a Little Too Late" (Mark Chesnutt song), a 1996 single by Mark Chesnutt
 "A Little Too Late" (Delta Goodrem song), a 2005 single by Delta Goodrem
 "A Little Too Late" (Toby Keith song), a 2006 single by Toby Keith

See also
 "Too Little Too Late", a song by JoJo
 "Too Little Too Late" (Barenaked Ladies song)
 Too Little, Too Late (Third Watch), an episode of the television series Third Watch
 "Too Much, Too Little, Too Late", a song by Johnny Mathis and Deniece Williams
 Too Much, Too Little, Too Late (EP), by Silver Sun